Lethal Weapon 3 is a pinball machine produced by Data East Pinball in 1992. It is based on the movie of the same name, which was the most popular film in summer 1992. The game featured a Generation 3 FullView dot matrix display, which was larger than the current industry standard, and displayed digitized movie clips. The game also featured a hidden leveling system, in which players "grab hold of the Data East gun handle and eliminate bad guys in one of three video crime simulator shoot outs". By 1994, it was Data East's all-time most successful pinball machine. The game was designed by Markus Rothkranz.

Other versions
Data East was one of few regular pinball company that manufactured custom pinball games e.g. for Aaron Spelling and Michael Jordan. These two pinball machines were based on the Lethal Weapon 3 pinball machine.

References

External links

 (Aaron Spelling version)
 (Michael Jordan version)
Pinball Archive rule sheet

Pinball machines based on films
Data East pinball machines
Lethal Weapon (franchise)
1992 pinball machines